Scortum neili, Neil's grunter or the Angalarri grunter, is a species of freshwater ray-finned fish, a grunter from the family Terapontidae. It is endemic to the Northern Territory of Australia where it is restricted to the East Baines River and the Angalarri River, which are part of the Victoria River system. The adults are found in small, shady, streams with slow currents over substrates of mixed sand, silt and rock, as well as in deeper rocky pools in gorges. After spawning the male guard and fan the eggs. This is an uncommon species of grunter which frequently has one or two black blotches which can be placed randomly as well a number of indistinct pale vertical bars on the flanks, and a silvery stripe just beneath its eyes.

References

Neil's grunter
Freshwater fish of the Northern Territory
Neil's grunter